The Hornerstown Formation is a Paleogene or latest Mesozoic geologic formation in New Jersey. The age of these deposits have been controversial. While most fossils are of animals types known from the earliest Cenozoic era, several fossils of otherwise exclusively Cretaceous age have been found. These include remains of the shark Squalicorax, several types of non-avian dinosaurs, the teleost fish Enchodus, several species of ammonite, and marine lizards referred to the genus Mosasaurus. Some of these remains show signs of severe abrasion and erosion, however, implying that they are probably re-worked from older deposits. Most of these fossils are restricted to the lowest point in the formation, one rich in fossils and known as the Main Fossiliferous Layer, or MFL. Other explanations for the out-of-place fossils in the MFL is that they represent a time-averaged assemblage that built up and remained unburied during a time of low sediment deposition, or that they were stirred up from deeper in the sediment and deposited together during a tsunami.

Vertebrate paleofauna

Birds

Non-Avian Dinosaurs

Crocodylomorphs

Ray-finned Fishes

See also 

 List of dinosaur-bearing rock formations

References

Bibliography 
 Weishampel, David B.; Dodson, Peter; and Osmólska, Halszka (eds.): The Dinosauria, 2nd, Berkeley: University of California Press. 861 pp. .

Danian Stage
Paleogene geology of New Jersey